Right atrial pressure (RAP) is the blood pressure in the right atrium of the heart. RAP reflects the amount of blood returning to the heart and the ability of the heart to pump the blood into the arterial system. RAP is often nearly identical to central venous pressure (CVP), although the two terms are not identical, as a pressure differential can sometimes exist between the venae cavae and the right atrium. CVP and RAP can differ when venous tone (i.e the degree of venous constriction) is altered. This can be graphically depicted as changes in the slope of the venous return plotted against right atrial pressure (where central venous pressure increases, but right atrial pressure stays the same; VR = CVP − RAP).

Factors affecting RAP
Factors that increase RAP include:
 Hypervolemia
 Forced exhalation
 Tension pneumothorax
 Heart failure
 Pleural effusion
 Decreased cardiac output
 Cardiac tamponade
 Mechanical ventilation and the application of positive end-expiratory pressure (PEEP)
 Pulmonary Hypertension
 Pulmonary Embolism
 Left to right shunted Atrial Septal Defect

Factors that decrease RAP include:
 Hypovolemia
 Deep inhalation
 Distributive shock

See also
 Pulmonary capillary wedge pressure
 Jugular venous pressure
 Central venous pressure

References

External links
 Cardiovascular Physiology Concepts
 Cardiovascular Physiology
 

Medical terminology
Medical monitoring
Cardiovascular physiology